The 48th Annual Japan Record Awards took place at the New National Theatre in Shibuya, Tokyo, on December 30, 2006, starting at 6:30PM JST. The primary ceremonies were televised in Japan on TBS.

Awards and nominations

Japan Record Award
 "Ikken" (ja)
 Singer: Kiyoshi Hikawa
 Lyricist: Yurio Matsui (ja)
 Composer: Hideo Mizumori (ja)
 Arranger: Makoto Saeki (ja)
 Record label: Columbia Music Entertainment

Best Vocal Performance
 Kumi Koda

Best New Artist
 Ayaka

New Artist Awards
Best New Artist nominations
 Ayaka
 SunSet Swish
 Aki Yamamoto (ja)
 WaT

Gold Awards
Japan Record Award nominations
 Kiyoshi Hikawa – "Ikken"
 BoA – "Winter Love"
 Mihimaru GT – "Kibun Jōjō ￪￪" (ja)
 Kobukuro – "Kimi to Iu Na no Tsubasa" (ja)
 Kaori Mizumori – "Kumano Kodō"
 W-inds – "Boogie Woogie 66" (ja)
 Nakamonomori Band (ja) – "Fly High" (ja)
 Sukima Switch – "Boku Note" (ja)
 Koda Kumi – "Yume no Uta"
 Ai Otsuka – "Ren'ai Shashin"

Best Composer
 Hiroshi Itsuki – "Takasebune"
 Singer: Hiroshi Itsuki

Best Lyricist
 Miyuki Nakajima – "Sorafune
 Singer: Tokio

Best Arranger
 Takeshi Kobayashi – "Yubi Kiri"
 Singer: Yo Hitoto

Planning Awards
 Hideaki Tokunaga – Vocalist 2 (ja)
 Mitsuko Nakamura (ja) – Yarōtachi no Uta
 Folk Song Yearbook 1966–1982  Folk & New Music Complete Works
 King Records, Columbia Music Entertainment, Sony Music Direct, Teichiku Records, EMI Music Japan, Nippon Crown, JVC Kenwood Victor Entertainment, For Life Music Entertainment, Pony Canyon, Yamaha Music Communications, Universal Music Japan
Yoshida Tadashi Dango Album II
 Yoshida Tadashi Orchestra, Yoshinao Ōsawa (ja), JVC Kenwood Victor Entertainment

Special Awards
 Toshiko Akiyoshi
 Exile and Koda Kumi – "Won't Be Long"
 Kigurumi – "Tarako Tarako Tarako" (ja)
 Ryoko Moriyama and Begin – "Nada Sōsō"
 Masashi Sada – Natsu Nagasaki kara Sada Masashi (ja)

Achievement Awards
 Yū Aku
 Hiroshi Ashino (ja)
 Sanechika Andō (ja)
 Hiroshi Eguchi (ja)
 Rei Nakanishi
 Tadao Hirayama
 Takeharu Yamamoto (ja)

Special Achievement Awards
 Yukio Aoshima
 Shōsuke Ichikawa (ja)
 Akira Ifukube
 Hiroshi Uchiyamada (ja)
 Setsuo Ohashi (ja)
 Masako Kawada (ja)
 Teruhiko Kuze (ja)
 Tōroku Takagi (ja)
 Keiko Matsuyama (ja)
 Satoshi Mihara (ja)
 Hiroshi Miyagawa (ja)

Special Honour Award
 Toru Funamura (ja)

Honourable Mention Award
Awarded by the Japan Composer's Association
 Miko Takegawa (ja)

See also 
57th NHK Kōhaku Uta Gassen

External links
Official Website.
Complete list of all winners.

Japan Record Awards
Japan Record Awards
Japan Record Awards
Japan Record Awards
2006